Barker Creek Flat is a rural locality in the South Burnett Region, Queensland, Australia.

Darli is a neighbourhood.

History 
The locality was officially named and bounded on 5 March 1999.

References 

South Burnett Region
Localities in Queensland